Sir William Gordon Bennett (19 February 1889 – 5 October 1982) was Unionist Party (Scotland) MP for Glasgow Woodside from 1950 to 1955.

References

External links 
 

1889 births
1982 deaths
Unionist Party (Scotland) MPs
Members of the Parliament of the United Kingdom for Glasgow constituencies
UK MPs 1950–1951
UK MPs 1951–1955
Knights Bachelor
Politicians awarded knighthoods
Royal Tank Regiment officers
British Army personnel of World War I